Arthur Richard Andrew Scace, CM, QC  -  was a lawyer and jurist in Toronto, Ontario, Canada. He was the chairman of the board of directors of the Bank of Nova Scotia and is the director of the Canadian Opera Company. After graduating from the University of Toronto Schools, he studied at the University of Toronto for a B.A., at the University of Oxford for a B.A., at Osgoode Hall Law School for an LL.B. and at Harvard University for an M.A.  While at the University of Toronto, he was a leader in the Deke fraternity.  He also has an honorary degree in the law, the LLD.  He obtained the honor of Queen's Counsel on 26 June 1986.

Scace has been partner, managing partner, and chairman of McCarthy Tétrault, a law firm founded 11 years before Canadian Confederation.

Scace was elected treasurer of the Law Society of Upper Canada in 1986.

References

Lawyers in Ontario
Businesspeople from Toronto
University of Toronto alumni
Alumni of the University of Oxford
Osgoode Hall Law School alumni
Harvard University alumni
Canadian King's Counsel
Members of the Order of Canada